Chiromachla perspicua is a moth in the family Erebidae. It is found in Cameroon, the Democratic Republic of Congo, Equatorial Guinea, Gabon, Ghana, Guinea, Nigeria, Sierra Leone, Togo, Uganda and possibly Kenya.

References

Nyctemerina
Moths described in 1854